Crosseola bollonsi is a species of minute sea snail or micromollusc, a marine gastropod mollusc in the family Conradiidae.

Description
The height of the shell attains 4 mm, its diameter 3.3 mm.

Distribution
This species is endemic to the North Cape, New Zealand.

References

 Powell A. W. B., New Zealand Mollusca, William Collins Publishers Ltd, Auckland, New Zealand 1979

External links
 New Zealand Mollusca: Crosseola bollonsi

bollonsi
Gastropods of New Zealand
Gastropods described in 1956